Spassky District is an administrative and municipal district (raion), one of the twenty-five in Ryazan Oblast, Russia. It is located in the center of the oblast. Its administrative center is the town of Spassk-Ryazansky. Population: 30,388 (2010 Census);  The population of Spassk-Ryazansky accounts for 25.5% of the district's total population.

References

Notes

Sources

Districts of Ryazan Oblast